The Kammalar (கம்மாளர்) is a Tamil caste group found in the Indian state of Tamil Nadu and in northeastern part of Sri Lanka. The Kammalars are involved in crafting. Kammalar is a generic term that comprises the communities of Kannar (brass-workers), Kollar (blacksmiths), Tarar (goldsmiths), Tatchar (carpenters) and Kartatchar (sculptors). kammalar's are classified and listed as backward class by both central government of India and State government of Tamil Nadu 
They worship various forms of this deity.

Etymology 
The word Kammalar is derived from the Tamil word Kam meaning "art" or "operation". The Kammalar finds mention in ancient Sangam literature, mentioning them by the name Kammiyar.  Their name is said to be derived from the phrase "one who gives the eyes", referring to their providing the eyes for statues of deities.

Synonyms

Tamil Nadu and Sri Lanka 
In Tamil Nadu, Tamil Achari is known as Tamil Kammalars. They are goldsmiths and landlords.

The Pather (Kammalar) community in Nachiyar Koil town of Tamil Nadu are renowned for making the ornamental brass Nachiarkoil lamps.

See also 
 Caste system in India
 Caste system in Sri Lanka

References

Indian castes
Social groups of Tamil Nadu
Sri Lankan Tamil castes